Adassa (born February 5, 1987) is an American urban reggaeton singer.

Early life 
Adassa was born in Miami, Florida, and raised in St. Croix, Virgin Islands, by her Afro-Colombian parents.

Career 
She has toured and collaborated with artists such as Daddy Yankee, Lil' Flip, Pitbull, Ivy Queen, Don Omar, Lil Jon, Kevin Lyttle, Vico C, Baby Rasta & Gringo, Wisin & Yandel, Sasha, Baby Bash and Juvenile among others.

She also made high-profile cameo appearances with Ciara and Missy Elliott on "1, 2 Step" (Don Candiani Reggaetón Remix), with Pitbull on the title track record off of her second album Kamasutra, and alongside Tego Calderón and Roselyn Sánchez.

She was also successful in Europe with the song "Bounce" (duet with the Turkish pop star Tarkan).

Her 2005 single "De Tra" reached No. 40 on Billboard Latin Tropical Airplay chart. Adassa's singles "Dancing Alone" & "Little White Lies", held top positions on the German dance charts in early 2013.

She made her acting debut in the Disney animated feature film Encanto as the voice of Dolores Madrigal. The following year, she acted in season 2 of Around the Sun, an episodic audio drama.

Discography

Albums 
 2004: On the Floor
 2005: Kamasutra
 2007: Adassa

Singles

Other charted songs

Music videos 
 "On the Floor" (2004)
 "De Tra" (2005)
 "Dejare de Quererte" (2005)
 "Kamasutra" (feat. Pitbull) (2006)
 "La Manera" (2007)
 "No Me Compares" (2007)
 "All I Wanna Do" (2008)
 "Sexy (Dance Remix)" (2008)
 "Brindemos Por El Amor" (2012)
 "La Gata" (2013)
 "BOOM (He Won't Get Away)" (David May Mix Cue feat. Snoop Dogg & Adassa) (2014)
 "I Wanna Feel Real" (Code Beat feat. Flo Rida, Teairra Marie, Adassa) (2014)
 "Loca" (feat. Pitbull) (2016)
 "Razor Blade" (Eyes Of Providence feat. Adassa) (2016)
 "Tu Traicion" (2017)
 "Porque Ella Y No Yo" (2018)
 "M.B.S" (2018)
 "Bello Y Eterno" (2021)
 We Don't Talk About Bruno (BYU Vocal Point feat. Adassa and One Voice Children's Choir) (2022)
 "Turn it Down" (ft. Or3o, Kathy Chan, CG5, Chi-Chi, DJSmell, Nenorama, Cami-cat, Jordan Fries) (2022)

Filmography

Film

References

External links 
 
 

1987 births
American people of Colombian descent
American reggaeton musicians
Living people
Musicians from Miami
Singer-songwriters from Florida
21st-century American women singers
21st-century American singers